Pedro Abad is a small town located in the province of Córdoba, Spain. According to the 2006 census (INE), the city has a population of 2934 inhabitants.

Parties

Buildings 

 Iglesia de la Asunción.Ermita del Santísimo Cristo de los Desamparados. Birth house of “Santa Rafaela M.ª Porras”, fundadora of “Esclavas del Sagrado Corazón de Jesús”.

 The Basharat Mosque, constructed and run by the islamic movement Ahmadiyya Muslim Community.

References

External links 
Pedro Abad - Sistema de Información Multiterritorial de Andalucía

Municipalities in the Province of Córdoba (Spain)